Pakistan Carpet Manufacturers and Exporters Association (PCMEA) was established in 1960 to run the affairs and work to promote carpet manufacturing industry of the country. The association is divided in two circles, Northern and Southern, with respective offices in Lahore and Karachi. The association has around 500 active members from all four provinces of the country. An executive body is elected every year comprising 24 members (12 from each circle).  In 2014, Usman Ghani was elected the central chairman.

Annual carpet exhibition
 PCMEA holds an annual carpet exhibition and invites international importers, retailers and buyers to attend the fair. PCMEA provides the foreign visitors with airfare and lodging to attend the fair that is normally held for 3 or 4 days. 

Here is a list of past exhibitions:

See also

 Pakistani rug
 Chobi rug
 Turkmen rug

References

External links
 PCMEA official website

Foreign trade of Pakistan